Argonectes is a genus of halftooths from tropical South America.

Species
There are currently two recognized species in this genus:
 Argonectes longiceps (Kner, 1858)
 Argonectes robertsi Langeani, 1999

References

Hemiodontidae
Characiformes genera
Fish of South America
Taxa named by James Erwin Böhlke
Taxa named by George S. Myers
Tropical fish